Upper Dudhana Dam, is an earthfill dam on Dudhana river near Jalna in the state of Maharashtra in India.

Specifications

Purpose
 Irrigation

See also
 Dams in Maharashtra
 List of reservoirs and dams in India

References

Dams in Maharashtra
Dams completed in 1964
Dams in Jalna district
1964 establishments in Maharashtra
20th-century architecture in India